Teshie is a coastal town in the Ledzokuku Municipal District, a district in the Greater Accra Region of southeastern Ghana.  Teshie is the ninth most populous settlement in Ghana, with a population of 171,875 people.

Politics 
Teshie is in the Ledzokuku constituency led by Hon. Ben Ayiku, a member of the National Democratic Congress, who succeeded Hon. Dr Bernard Okoe Boye of the New Patriotic Party.

Traditions 

Teshie is one of the independent towns of the Ga State, every August, the town celebrates the Homowo festival. It is believed that the original Teshie people came from La, a town that lies to the west of Teshie.

Fort Augustaborg, built by the Danes in 1787, is located in Teshie and was occupied by the British from 1850 to 1957. It is believed that Teshie is 300 years old as of 2011.

The town is rich in diversity as a result of the country's current democracy and development program.

Teshie stretches from the Kpeshie Lagoon to Teshie-Nungua Estates (first junction) from East to West on the Teshie Road. Teshie has grown enormously to become one of the biggest towns in Ghana.

Kane Kwei Carpentry Workshop

The town of Teshie is also known as the home of design coffins, invented in the 1950s by Seth Kane Kwei and still made in the Kane Kwei Carpentry Workshop (run by Eric Adjetey Anang) and by several other artists.

Labadi Beach

The Labadi Beach, or more properly known as La Pleasure Beach, is near Teshie. The beach is the busiest beach on Ghana's coast. It is one of Greater Accra Region's few beaches and is maintained by the local hotels.

Schools

Tertiary 
 Nursing and Midwifery Training College, Teshie
 Family Health University College, Nursing & Midwifery School
 Kofi Annan International Peacekeeping Training Centre (KAIPTC)
 Ghana Military Academy Training School.

Secondary 
 Presbyterian Senior High School, Teshie
 Teshie Technical Training Centre

Basic 
 Teshie LEKMA Schools
 Teshie Dar-es-Salaam Primary 'A' School
 Wajir Barracks Schools
 Trinity Junior High School
 Teshie Dar-es-Salaam Schools
 Teshie Anglican Schools
 Field Engineer Schools
 Teshie Methodist Basic Schools
 Teshie Roman Catholic School,
Royal Calvary School
 Teshie Presbyterian Schools.
Lincoln International School
 Sap's School
 Ford School
 Unique Child School

There are also a number of privately run schools, notable among them are God's Way Preparatory School, Teshie St. John Schools, Sunrise Preparatory & JHS, Nanna Mission Academy, Ford Schools Ltd

Transport

Road

The widening of the dual carriage way from OTU Barracks to First Junction was in the late 1970s.

Train
Teshie is served by a station of the eastern section of the national railway system.

See also 
 Railway stations in Ghana

Publications 
 2013 Master of Coffins – 26 minutes documentary about artist Eric Adjetey Anang, by Luis Nachbin / Matrioska Films for GloboTV (Brasil)
 2008 The Buried Treasures of the Ga: Coffin Art in Ghana. Regula Tschumi. Benteli, Bern. 

 International exhibitions 
 2011/12.Sainsbury Centre of Visual Arts, Griff Rhys Jones' Ghanaian 'fantasy coffin' 2011/12. Miracles of Africa'', Hämeenlinna Art Museum, Hämeenlinna and Oulu Museum of Art, Oulu, Finland.

References

External links

Populated places in the Greater Accra Region